La inocente ("The Innocent") is a 1972 Mexican film. It stars Sara García.

Cast

External links
 

1972 films
Mexican drama films
1970s Spanish-language films
Films directed by Rogelio A. González
1970s Mexican films